Gayle is a hamlet sited  south of Hawes in Wensleydale, North Yorkshire, England. The hamlet is noted for the beck that flows through it and the old mill, which featured on the BBC programme Restoration.

History
Gayle was originally a farming settlement but the population grew during the late 18th century to around 350 with employment in local quarries, coal-mining in Sleddale and in a water-driven cotton mill on Gayle Beck. The population of the village later contracted. In modern times, the population of the hamlet is recorded within the Parish of Hawes for census purposes. Historically, the hamlet was in the Parish of Aysgarth, in the wapentake of Hang West. Hawes was a small village or hamlet until the late 1790s, when the Richmond to Lancaster Turnpike was diverted away from the moor south of Gayle to run through Hawes, which accelerated the growth of Hawes and established that as a parish. The hamlet is now part of the Parish of Hawes in the district of Richmondshire.

East of the hamlet is the remains of a supposed Roman encampment, believed to be an outpost of the camp at nearby Bainbridge. The Cam High Fell road passed near to Gayle, and the village itself may have been a point where Gayle Beck was either bridged, or forded. A ford still runs through the beck to the west of the grade II listed Gayle Bridge. The main road through the hamlet ran in an east\west formation; the branch into Hawes was not opened until 1829 as part of act relating to the Hawes to Kendal Turnpike.

Nikolaus Pevsner, writing in his book The Buildings of England; Yorkshire, the North Riding, describes Gayle as "...in its village way, is almost as intricate as Hawes, almost as intricate as an Italian stone village...". The core area of the older pre-20th century village, was created as a conservation area in 2001, with most of the other housing being situated on the road north into Hawes.

Gayle had a Methodist Church, constructed around 1755. A breakaway Methodist sect, associated with the Sandemanians in Scotland, was previously associated with the village, but only their graveyard, east of the chapel now remains. The chapel itself was adapted into the village institute, and is now a grade II listed building.

Industry
Gayle Mill, constructed in 1780s, is now a grade II* listed building, a scheduled monument and came third in the BBC's 2004 Restoration contest. Originally a cotton-spinning mill it was converted to a sawmill in 1878. It is the oldest structurally unaltered cotton mill in existence, and its Thomson Double-Vortex turbine built by Williamson's of Kendal in 1878 is believed to be the world's oldest surviving water turbine still in its original situation. The mill has been restored and is now open to the public. As the leat is boarded with timber, it is known as a pentrough. 
A millpond was also built for the mill some way to the south on level ground beside the beck. This was built so that in times of low water flow, the water could be collected overnight and then released when needed the next day to power the mill.

The hills and the valley of Sleddale to the south and west of the hamlet provided coal and peat for local consumption for heating purposes. Many of the buildings in and around Gayle and Hawes were built with carboniferous sandstone quarried from Scar Head and East Shaw quarries south of the hamlet.

References

Sources

 North Yorkshire Federations of Women's Institutes. The North Yorkshire Village Book. Countryside Books, Newbury, 1991. .

External links

 Gayle Mill website.
 BBC News: Wensleydale water-powered sawmill still cutting it.
 Friends of Gayle Mill (supporters' group) website.

Hamlets in North Yorkshire
Mill museums in England
Hawes